Giola Gandini (1906–1941) was an Italian painter.

Biography 

Gandini was born on May 19, 1906, in Parma to Ernesto Gandini and Diomira Di Centa of Venice. A childhood bout with polio limited her mobility and contributed to her reclusive lifestyle.

Gandini studied at the Accademia di Belle Arti di Venezia and at the atelier of the painter Vincenzo De Stefani. Her paintings feature intricate figure studies of women and intimate domestic scenes. Her painting career spanned twelve years from 1929 until her death in 1941. During this time, she participated in many exhibitions, including the Rome Quadriennale of 1935, and the Venice Biennale of 1940.

In October 2014, Gandini's work was featured posthumously in the exhibition Gabriella e le altre: quattro donne in Biennale at the Casa delle Muse in Mirano, Italy. The exhibition also featured work by Gabriella Oreffice, Maria Vinca, and Ernesta Oltremonti and was curated by Patrizia Castagnoli.

In addition to her work as a painter, Gandini was an accomplished pianist. She died September 1941, at the age of 35, in Venice.

Gallery

References

Bibliography 
 
 
 
 
 

1906 births
1941 deaths
Italian women painters
20th-century Italian painters
20th-century Italian women artists
People with polio
Accademia di Belle Arti di Venezia alumni